University Azzurri Football Club is an Australian semi-professional football club based in Darwin, the Northern Territory. Founded in 1999 as University Rangers, the club merged with Nakara Azzurri in 2010 to form University Azzurri. The club currently competes in the NorZone Premier League, with matches played at University Oval. The club maintains affiliation with Charles Darwin University.

History
The origins of University Rangers is traced to 1999, where the club was formed as an associated sporting club of the Northern Territory University Sports Association (now Charles Darwin University Sports Association). In 2010, the club merged with Nakara Azzurri, who themselves were founded in 2006 after the merger of Nakara SC and Darwin Azzurri SC. Both clubs had previously established themselves in the local leagues of Darwin.

Nakara Azzurri

Nakara Azzurri Football Club is a defunct Australian football club that was based in Darwin, the Northern Territory. Founded in 1994 as Darwin Azzurri, the club merged with Nakara Soccer Club in 2006 to form Nakara Azzurri. The club competed in the NorZone Premier League, with matches played form Nakara Oval, until it dissolved at the end of the 2009 season. In 2010, the club merged with University Rangers to form University Azzurri.

The club's origins are traced to the founding of Darwin Azzurri on 28 November 1994. The club competed in the local Darwin football leagues. In 2006, Darwin Azzurri merged with Nakara Soccer Club to form Nakara Azzurri. In 2010, the club merged with University Rangers to form University Azzurri.

Honours
 1999 DSL Winners.
 2004 TASL League Champions.
 2006 Northern Zone All Ages Division 2 Final Series Winners.
 2008 Northern Zone All Ages Division 1 League Champions.
 2008 Northern Zone All Ages Division 1 Final Series Winners.
 2008 Charles Darwin University Sports Association 'Team of Year'.
 2009 Northern Zone All Ages Division 1 League runners up
 2009 Northern Zone All Ages Division 1 Final Series Winners.
 2014 Norzone Womens Premiers
 2015 Singa Cup under 18 runners up
 2015 Norzone Premiers under 18 Champions
 2016 Norzone Premier League Reserves Champion
 2016 Norzone Womens Open League Champions Pool B
 2018 Norzone Premier League Reserves Premiers
 2019 FFA CUP Darwin Finalist

References

External links
 Official club website

Soccer clubs in the Northern Territory
University soccer clubs in Australia
Association football clubs established in 1999
1999 establishments in Australia
Sport in Darwin, Northern Territory
Italian-Australian backed sports clubs of Northern Territory